Spider-Plant Man is a British parody short film which parodies the Spider-Man 2002 film adaptation, made for the Comic Relief 2005 appeal and aired on BBC One on 11 March 2005. It featured Rowan Atkinson as Peter Piper/Spider-Plant Man and Rachel Stevens as his love-interest Jane-Mary. Jim Broadbent also made an appearance, portraying Batman, and Tony Robinson as Robin.

Plot
Peter Piper, a photographer, visits a laboratory where a spider plant with teeth has been created. Piper attempts to take a picture, but is bitten on the bottom by a plant coming down from the ceiling.

Piper leaves the lab via a back door, sits in a dark alley, sweating, and begins to turn green. His molecular structure is shown to be changing with the text "This means something very nasty is happening". When he wakes up, he finds that when he stretches, plants shoot from his arms. He is also able to climb walls. Suddenly, a sweeper, who is also crawling on the wall and cleaning the walls, appears there.

Piper is then shown sitting on a roof, when he sees that Jane-Mary is getting mugged. He goes to save her, but he realizes that he needs a costume. He appears in the alley in a Red Indian costume, a fairy costume and eventually in his green Spider-Plant suit. He saves Jane-Mary, who falls in love with him. He suggests to her that he might be Peter Piper, only to be told that Piper is a loser and a creep. Later Spider-Plant man is seen saving the day around London including helping to retrieve Demo song tapes for the singer and reality TV star Peter Andre.

Spider-Plant Man is then shown landing in an alley late at night where another man says he is his enemy. Peter guesses that he is the Green Goblin, Doctor Octopus, the Itchy Skull, or The Human Man, but it appears to be Batman. The Caped Crusader tells him that he is really angry that no one cares about him anymore and that everyone only wants spiders nowadays. He no longer has the Batmobile, owning only a dilapidated "Bat-Clio". Even Robin has abandoned him. "Apparently he was only in it for the money." Piper tries to help Batman but tells him he has much more important things to do. Suddenly Batman tells Piper that he has kidnapped Jane-Mary and demands him to give up being a Super Hero or she will die but luckily Piper quickly guesses that Batman has trapped her on top of the Tower Bridge and rushes off to save her.

Spider-Plant Man swings through London, wondering where Tower Bridge is, while Batman, who couldn't get his Bat-Clio to start, takes the Underground to Tower Bridge. Jane Mary is bound to a flag on Tower Bridge by Batman. Spider-Plant Man and Batman begin to fight, where they are mistaken by a reporter for Fathers 4 Justice activists. Peter fires a spider plant at him, followed by Batman throwing his Batarang and the battle goes on.

Batman's sidekick Robin (played by Tony Robinson) arrives, and makes a deal with Batman for 20% of the profits on Batman products and a Robinmobile and starts attacking Piper. Whilst hanging from Tower Bridge, Spider-Plant Man makes a deal with Robin for 25% on all pajama sales and his own cereal brand with real marshmallows, Robin switches sides and attacks Batman. Batman is punched off the tower and lands on the reporter. He then punches a Fathers 4 Justice supporter and hijacks a little kid's scooter and gets away.

Spider-Plant Man and Jane-Mary start to kiss. Robin tells Peter it's time to go and moments later Peter punches him. He then asks Jane-Mary whether she will marry him, and she responds, "Who's asking me, Spider-Plant Man or the man behind the spandex?" He replies, "You choose". Jane-Mary is then shown lying in the sun on a beach, next to Piper who is still in his Spider-Plant suit. Piper then turns to the audience, smiling as then a web shoots out with the words "END"

Cast
Rowan Atkinson as Peter Piper / Spider-Plant Man 
Rachel Stevens as Jane-Mary
Jim Broadbent as Batman
Mackenzie Crook as Scientist
Nick Frost as Scientist
Simon Pegg as Frank Matters
Peter Andre as Himself
Tony Robinson as Robin

Development
Spider-Plant Man originated while Rowan Atkinson and some other writers were thinking up ideas for a possible fifth series of Blackadder. One of these ideas was Batadder, a parody of Batman, where Atkinson would play the title character, and Robinson would play his sidekick based on Robin. Plans for the fifth Blackadder series eventually fell through and that particular idea gave rise to the Comic Relief special. Ed Bye of Red Dwarf fame directed the episode "Spider Plant Man" and used CGI from The Farm and Steve Deakin-Davies' Ambition company.

References

External links

Plot overview 

2005 films
2005 short films
2005 comedy films
2000s superhero comedy films
British comedy short films
Comic Relief
Parodies of Spider-Man
2000s English-language films
Unofficial Spider-Man films